Elliott Laurel is a  open space preserve located in Phillipston, Massachusetts. The property, notable for its extensive stands of mountain laurel, is managed by the land conservation non-profit organization The Trustees of Reservations. Elliott Laurel also contains woodlands, ledges, boulders, and a hayfield.

History and recreation
The reserve is named for Frederick W. Elliott, who donated the original acreage to the Trustees of Reservations in 1941. Additional property was purchased in 1972.

Elliott Laurel is open to hiking, cross country skiing, and hunting (in season). A   network of trails loop through the reservation and ascend to a scenic vista along a series of ledges.

References

External links
Elliott Laurel The Trustees of Reservations
Trail map

The Trustees of Reservations
Protected areas of Worcester County, Massachusetts
Open space reserves of Massachusetts
Protected areas established in 1941
1941 establishments in Massachusetts